Searenia is a genus of moths belonging to the family Tortricidae.

Species
Searenia cuprea Razowski & Becker, 2000

See also
List of Tortricidae genera

References

 , 2000: Seven new Neotropical genera of Euliini (Lepidoptera: Tortricidae) and their species. Polskie Pismo Entomologiczne, Polish Journal of Entomology 69: 335–345.

External links
tortricidae.com

Euliini
Tortricidae genera